Sankt Veit am Vogau is a former municipality in the district of Leibnitz in Styria, Austria. Since the 2015 Styria municipal structural reform, it is part of the municipality Sankt Veit in der Südsteiermark.

Homophobia and Islamophobia
In March 2013 the small town created a large nationwide publicity, when the town's mayor, Manfred Tatzl from ÖVP told falter.at in an interview, "Wir sind hier auf dem Land, Homosexualität verurteilt ein jeder." ("We are living in a rural area, everybody here condemns homosexuality.") and added, "[es gebe] "Gott sei Dank" keine Muslime im Ort" (there were, "Thank God, [...] no muslims in town.")  in order to defend the town's reverend Karl Tropper, who had been preaching against homosexuality and Islam for years.

References

Cities and towns in Leibnitz District